The Dynamic Billard Sankt Johann in the Pongau Open 2018 (sometimes known as the 2018 Austria Open) was the second Euro Tour 9-Ball pool event in 2018. The event was won by Greece's Alexander Kazakis who defeated Estonia's Denis Grabe 9–5 in the final. This was Kazkis's first Euro Tour victory.

The previous years champion Mario He was defeated in the semi-final by Grabe 9–4.

Tournament format
The event saw a total of 208 players compete, in a double-elimination knockout tournament, until the last 32 stage; where the tournament was contested as single elimination.

Prize fund 
The tournament prize fund was similar to that of other Euro Tour events, with €4,500 for the winner of the event.

Tournament results

References

External links

Euro Tour
2018 Euro Tour events
April 2018 sports events in Austria